Laura Kubzansky is Lee Kum Kee Professor of Social and Behavioral Sciences and Co-Director of the Center for Health and Happiness at the Harvard T.H. Chan School of Public Health. She is a Fellow of the American Psychological Association. She holds a Ph.D. in Social Psychology from the University of Michigan and an M.P.H. from the Harvard School of Public Health. One of her research topics is the potential link between happiness and physical health.

References

Year of birth missing (living people)
Living people
Harvard School of Public Health faculty
American sociologists
American women sociologists
University of Michigan alumni
University of Otago alumni
Harvard School of Public Health alumni
21st-century American women